Timothy James Boon (born 1 November 1961 in Balby, Doncaster, Yorkshire) is a former English cricketer who used to be the coach of Leicestershire.

Boon had a successful playing career predominantly with Leicestershire. However he started his young playing career with his local club Warmsworth CC. He played his first game in 1980 and his last in 1995 and passed 1000 runs seven times. He had a spell with KwaZulu-Natal in South Africa, and later played for Norfolk.

In recent years Boon has made more of an impression as a coach. He was named the England U-19 coach in 1999. Later Boon was given the job of England's video analyst and was instrumental in helping England win the 2005 Ashes series.

Boon was offered the job of Leicestershire coach in 2006 as a successor to James Whitaker. He went on to be the coach of the England Under 19 Cricket Team. In 2017 he was appointed by the England and Wales Cricket Board as a cricket liaison officer.

External links
Cric Info Profile

References

English cricket coaches
English cricketers
Leicestershire cricketers
1961 births
Living people
Cricketers from Doncaster
Norfolk cricketers
KwaZulu-Natal cricketers
English cricketers of 1969 to 2000
English cricketers of the 21st century